Henry Sterling Magoon (January 31, 1832March 3, 1889) was an American lawyer and Republican politician.  He served one term in the United States House of Representatives, representing Wisconsin's 3rd congressional district.

Biography
Born in Monticello in the Wisconsin Territory, Magoon attended the Rock River Seminary, Mount Morris, Illinois, and was graduated from the Western Military College, Drennon, Kentucky, in 1853.  He studied law in the Montrose Law School, Frankfort, Kentucky, and then worked as professor of ancient languages at the University of Nashville.  In 1857, he returned to Wisconsin where he was admitted to the bar and commenced a law practice at Darlington.

A year later, he was elected district attorney of Lafayette County.  He then served as member of the Wisconsin State Senate in 1871 and 1872.

Magoon was elected as a Republican to the Forty-fourth Congress (March 4, 1875 – March 3, 1877) as the representative of Wisconsin's 3rd congressional district.
He was defeated seeking renomination at the Republican district convention in 1876.
He resumed the practice of law in Milwaukee, Wisconsin.
Magoon was a regent of the University of Wisconsin–Madison for one term.
Magoon was the first native of Wisconsin to serve in the Wisconsin State Senate or in the United States House of Representatives.
He died while on a visit to his summer home in Darlington, Wisconsin, on March 3, 1889. He was interred in Union Grove Cemetery.

Sources

Notes

External links
 Magoon Family Crest and Name History

1832 births
1889 deaths
People from Darlington, Wisconsin
Republican Party Wisconsin state senators
Republican Party members of the United States House of Representatives from Wisconsin
19th-century American politicians
People from Lafayette County, Wisconsin
People from Shullsburg, Wisconsin